The Real Housewives of Salt Lake City (abbreviated RHOSLC) is an American reality television series that premiered on November 11, 2020, on Bravo. Developed as the tenth installment of The Real Housewives franchise, it has aired three seasons and focuses on the personal and professional lives of several women living in or around Salt Lake City, Utah.

The recent third season cast consists of Lisa Barlow, Heather Gay, Meredith Marks, Whitney Rose, and Jen Shah, with Angie Harrington, Angie Katsanevas and Danna Bui-Negrete serving as Friends of the Housewives. Previously-featured cast members include original housewife Mary Cosby and subsequent housewife Jennie Nguyen.

Overview and casting

Seasons 1–present 
The Real Housewives of Salt Lake City was announced at the BravoCon fan convention in New York City on November 16, 2019. Season 1 was developed, cast, and Produced by InventTV. The cast members consisting of Lisa Barlow, Mary Cosby, Heather Gay, Meredith Marks, Whitney Rose, and Jen Shah were announced on September 9, 2020. The series premiered on November 11, 2020.
 
In February 2021, the show was renewed for a second season by Bravo. The second season premiered on September 12, 2021. The entire cast of the first season returned for the second season, joined by new housewife Jennie Nguyen.
 
On January 7, 2022, Andy Cohen confirmed via Instagram that Mary Cosby had not attended the Season 2 reunion. A few days later, Cohen confirmed rumors that Cosby had quit the show and would not be returning for Season 3. On January 25, Bravo announced that they had fired Nguyen after the discovery of her incendiary Facebook posts criticizing the Black Lives Matter movement. Nguyen has denied any racist allegations and claimed that she had a team of people running her social media.

The third season premiered on September 28, 2022. Barlow, Gay, Marks, Rose and Shah returned, with Angie Harrington, Angie Katsanevas and Danna Bui-Negrete joining as friends of the housewives.

In February 2023, it was announced Shah had started her six and a half year prison sentence in a minimum-security jail in Texas.

Timeline of cast members

Arrest of Jen Shah
During filming of the second season, Shah, was arrested on March 30, 2021, for wire fraud and money laundering via running a nationwide telemarketing scheme that targeted the elderly and vulnerable working-class people. On July 11, 2022, Shah plead guilty towards, conspiracy to wire fraud and was facing up to 11-14 years in prison. On January 6, 2023, Shah was sentenced to jail for six and a half years. She began her prison sentence on February 17 of the same year.

Episodes

Reception

Ratings

References

External links 

 
 

 
2020s American reality television series
2020 American television series debuts
Bravo (American TV network) original programming
English-language television shows
Culture of Salt Lake City
Television shows filmed in Utah
Television shows set in Utah
Women in Utah